The 2000 Short Track Speed Skating World Cup was a multi-race tournament over a season for short track speed skating. The season began on 19 October 1999 and ended on 4 February 2000. The World Cup was organised by the ISU who also ran world cups and championships in speed skating and figure skating.

Men

Events

World Cup Rankings

Women

Events

World Cup Rankings

Podium summary

References 
Results

ISU Short Track Speed Skating World Cup
World Cup
World Cup